The Danyang North railway station (Simplified Chinese: 丹阳北站) is a high-speed railway station in Danyang, Jiangsu, China. It is served by the Jinghu High-Speed Railway. The station is at the northern end of the Danyang–Kunshan Grand Bridge the longest bridge in the world.

References 

Railway stations in Jiangsu
Railway stations in China opened in 2010